Keith Gordon Waples (December 8, 1923 – May 7, 2021) was a Canadian Hall of Fame sulky driver and horse trainer in the sport of harness racing. In 1959, Waples became the first driver to record a sub two-minute mile in Canada and the first to win a $100,000 race in Canada.

In 1962, Keith Waples drove Tie Silk to victory in the International Trot at Roosevelt Raceway and in 1972 with the colt Strike Out he won the Little Brown Jug, the Adios Pace and Prix d'Été.

Keith Waples was inducted into Canada's Sports Hall of Fame in 1973  and the Canadian Horse Racing Hall of Fame in 1978  and the United States Harness Racing Hall of Fame in 1987. In 2008, Waples was an inductee (Athlete category) of the Midland (Ontario) Sports Hall of Fame. Waples died in May 2021, at the age of 97.

References 

1923 births
2021 deaths
Canadian harness racing drivers
Canadian harness racing trainers
Canadian Horse Racing Hall of Fame inductees
Sportspeople from Simcoe County
United States Harness Racing Hall of Fame inductees